Risalpur (Pashto/) is a city in Nowshera District, Khyber-Pakhtunkhwa, Pakistan, on the Nowshera-Mardan Road. It is nearly 45 km from Peshawar and 18 km from Mardan and is located at 34°4'52N 71°58'21E. In a basin some 1014 feet above sea level, it is bounded on the south and west by the Kabul and Kalpani rivers, respectively. The famous Khyber Pass lies 90 kilometers to the north.

Risalpur is known as "Home of Eagles" and "Home of Sappers". It has several important educational institutions and industrial plants. Languages spoken here are Urdu, English, Pashto, and others.

The Risalpur Export Processing Zone is on the main Nowshera-Mardan road. The Risalpur Cantonment itself lies on high ground, some 30 feet above the surrounding area, with the oldest building dating from 1913 or 1914 The population that mostly lives here are from mixed Pushtoon tribes 71|58|21|E|region:PK_type:city|display=title}}

Military history

In 1910 Risalpur had a former aerodrome and airfield of the Royal Flying Corps, and later the Royal Air Force.

During the First World War, the Royal Flying Corps established an airfield and a fighter conversion unit at Risalpur in British India.

In the Second World War and by 1940, RAF Risalpur had become both an established training and an operational airfield of the Royal Air Force (RAF) of the United Kingdom.  It officially became the airfield of the Pakistan Air Force (PAF) on 15 August 1947.

No. 31 Squadron RAF was stationed at Risalpur in 1919 and was used to bomb Kabul and Jalalabad in Afghanistan and later conducted operations in FATA against Faqir of Ipi in Waziristan, along with No. 114 Squadron RAF of the Royal Air Force of Britain.   No. 31 Squadron RAF was formed at Farnborough on 11 October 1915.  Its first deployment was to Risalpur's Nowshera District of Pakhtunkhwa province (previously North-West Frontier Province), in British India.

With its BE2Cs and Farmans, during this time No. 31 Squadron RAF and No. 114 Squadron RAF took part in operations in the Third Anglo-Afghan War and being part of The Great Game, on the North-West Frontier and FATA. The bombing was done to ensure the patency of the Durand line border between Afghanistan and British India.

In September 1919 BE2s of the Royal Flying Corps were replaced by Bristol Fighters.

The No. 31 Squadron RAF and No. 114 Squadron RAF bombing of Kabul and FATA stopped with the signing of the Rawalpindi Agreement in Rawalpindi (signed on 8 August 1919 and amended on 22 November 1921) between British India and Afghanistan, celebrated as Afghanistan's National Day now.

No. 114 Squadron RAF was disbanded by being re-numbered No 28 on 1 Apr 1920.

But the Waziristan campaign (1936–1939) continued in FATA and Bannu Pakhtunkhwa against Faqir of Ipi, which included the use of aircraft such as Hawker Harts, Westland Wapitis, and Hawker Audaxs flying from Risalpur and Peshawar.

The No. 31 Squadron RAF conducted air support in the FATA campaign against Faqir of Ipi in Mir Ali  and in Wanna, and in Pakhtunkhwa's district of Bannu.

Trouble flared up on 23 July 1938, when a lashkar launched a daring attack on the town of Bannu, Mir Ali and Wanna, killing up to 200 civilians and damaging a considerable amount of property. At the height of the campaign, some 60,000 regular and irregular troops were employed by the British in an effort to bring in control an estimated 4,000 hostile tribesmen of FATA.

In April 1939 the No. 31 Squadron RAF changed to the bomber and transport role.

During 1941, the No. 31 Squadron RAF began to concentrate on transport duties with seconded DC-2s. Returning to India the No. 31 Squadron RAF re-equipped with the Dakota.

After the Japanese invasion of Burma, No. 31 Squadron RAF flew missions between Calcutta and Rangoon dropping supplies for the XIVth Army.

After World War II the No. 31 Squadron RAF moved to Java. In 1946 the Squadron was disbanded in Java and reformed at PAF Base Masroor, Maripur Karachi. At the end of 1947 No. 31 Squadron RAF was again disbanded, but reformed in July 1948 in Britain.

During British rule, the British Army's 14/20th Hussars were garrisoned for two years at Risalpur, Nowshera Pakhtunkhwa until 1933.

It is stated that the army of 14th/20th Hussars stayed in Risalpur town of Nowshera Pakhtunkhwa until 1933. In fact, they never arrived for their tour of duty in British India until early in 1934.

Upon arriving from Egypt, where they had previously been stationed for two years, they disembarked in Karachi and immediately traveled to the town of Risalpur in district Nowshera North West Frontier Province and stayed there until late in 1936 whereupon they were transferred to Lucknow.

The Royal Horse Artillery were also stationed at Risalpur Town of District Nowshera of Pakhtunkhwa.

The airfield was formally established as PAF Station Risalpur, after the creation of Pakistan on 15 August 1947 with 20 officers, 21 trainees, 23 senior non commissioned officers (SNCOs) and 257 airmen.  The airfield comprised only a handful of men and some equipment.

One month later, the Flying Training School was established here.  Wing Commander Asghar Khan, later to become the first Air Chief of the PAF, took over as the first Officer Commanding of the school, with Harvard and Tiger Moth aircraft in the inventory.

Flt Lt M Khyber Khan, who later rose to the rank of Air Vice Marshal, and his student, Flight Cadet Akhtar, flew the first training sortie on 22 September 1947.

On 13 April 1948, the founder of Pakistan, Muhammad Ali Jinnah, visited Risalpur Flying Training School and raised its level to that of a college.

Risalpur thus became the genesis of PAF pilots.  It became the only military academy of Pakistan to be visited by Jinnah. At this ceremony, Jinnah took the General Salute at the parade. Fighter aircraft from Peshawar Airbase, from the nearby Peshawar district of Pakhtunkhwa performed aerobatics at the event.

On 21 January 1967 President Ayub Khan elevated the status of the Pakistan Air Force College, Risalpur to that of a Pakistan Air Force Academy.  Currently, it consists of five different components.

At the heart of the Pakistan Air Force since its inception, the Pakistan Air Force Academy, Risalpur's Nowshera Pakhtunkhwa, has bred generations of officers for the PAF and other branches of the Pakistani Armed Forces.

The Pakistan Air Force Academy at Nowshera Pakhtunkhwa was established in 1947.

Incidents 
On 9 November 2007, unknown miscreants fired three rockets that landed near Risalpur in Nowshera District, without causing any damage to life or property.

Schools 

 College of Aeronautical Engineering NUST
 Military College of Engineering (M.C.E.), NUST, Risalpur Cantt
 Fazaia Degree College, Risalpur Cantt
 Nisar Shaheed Degree College, Risalpur Cantt
 Presentation Convent High School, Risalpur Cantt
 Federal Government (F.G.) Public High School, Risalpur Cantt
 Army Iqra Public School, Risalpur Cantt
 Government Higher Secondary School, Risalpur Cantt
 Federal Government (F.G.) Sapper Boys High School, Risalpur Cantt
 Federal Government (F.G.) Sapper Girls High School, Risalpur Cantt
 Saint Joseph High School, Risalpur Cantt
 The City School, Risalpur Cantt
 Beaconhouse School System, Risalpur Cantt
Sir Syed Public School and College Risalpur Cantt

Additional information 
Due to the lack of quality educational institutions in Mardan and Nowshara District, many students travel daily to Risalpur in order to study at the relatively better educational institutions operated by the Armed Forces of Pakistan.  The students who come to these institutions usually belong to the privileged class of the two districts, or their parents suffer through tremendous financial hardship in order to send their children to these schools.

The headquarters of the Pakistan Locomotive Factory is also located here.

Climate 
Risalpur has a Humid subtropical climate (Köppen: Cwa) which has hot and humid summers, and cold to mild winters.

References

External links 

 Risalpur is calling and I must go by Shaikh Muhammad Ali

Populated places in Nowshera District